Tervise Paradiis ('Health Paradise') is a water park and hotel in Pärnu, Estonia. It is the largest water park in Estonia.

The facility was opened in 2004.

Besides other attractions, the water park has 4 different slides. The longest slide is with the length of 85 m. The centre has also 4-metre diving platform and rapid mountain rivers.

References

External links
 

Buildings and structures in Pärnu
Swimming in Estonia
Hotels in Estonia